Refugee is a 2006 Indian Bengali-language action film directed by Haranath Chakraborty and produced by Shrikant Mohta and Mahendra Soni under the banner of Shree Venkatesh Films. It stars Prosenjit Chatterjee as a prominent refugee from Bangladesh and Rambha in the female lead, with Rishabh Prasad as the narrator and the couples' manservant in the film. It is a remake of the Telugu  film Chatrapathi.

Cast 
 Prosenjit as Shiba (Shiva)
 Rambha as Julie
 Rajesh Sharma
 Rudranil Ghosh as Ashok
 Biplab Chatterjee
 Jagannath Guha 
 Chandan Sen
 Ratna Ghoshal
 Kalyani Mondal as Shiba's mother
 Nimu Bhowmick
 Rishabh Prasad as manservant

Soundtrack

References

External links

2006 films
2000s Bengali-language films
Bengali-language Indian films
Bengali remakes of Telugu films
Indian gangster films
Indian action drama films
2006 action drama films
Films directed by Haranath Chakraborty